The Meldorfer Gelehrtenschule (MGS) is a Highschool in Meldorf in the county Dithmarschen in Schleswig-Holstein. The school was founded as a Latin school in 1540. The School authority is the county Dithmarschen.   there are 60 teachers and 886 students in 35 forms.

History 
After its founding in 1540 two individual buildings were used as school buildings until they became too small, because of too many students and not enough space to build a library and rooms for science education.
Until 1962 today's Dithmarschen county museum was the main school building. In 1962 the school and its students moved to the modern school building.

Notable former teachers 
 Martin Luserke (1880–1968), Progressive Pedagogue, Bard and Writer (1947–1952)

Notable former students 
 Claus Harms (1778–1855), Priest
 Hans Reimer Claussen (1804–1894), Politician (1820–1823)
 Karl Müllenhoff (1818–1884), Teacher and Scientist (1830–1837)
 Adolf Bartels (1862–1945), Poet, Journalist and Politician (1877–1882)
 Gustav Frenssen (1863–1945), Writer
 Elmar Treptow (born 1937), Philosopher and Professor
 Heinrich Aye (1851–1923), Priest, Founder of Ostholstein museum 
 Holger Christiansen (born 1957), Teacher and Scientist
 Johann Wadephul (born 1963), Politician 
 Lars Jessen (born 1969), Director

Sources 
 Meldorfer Gelehrtenschule (Hrsg.): Zu den öffentlichen Prüfungen der Meldorfer Gelehrtenschule, welche ... stattfinden werden, so wie zur Entlassung der Abiturienten ... ladet ergebenst ein. Bundies, Meldorf 1843–1870 (Jg. 1867–1870 )
 Meldorfer Gelehrtenschule (Hrsg.): Zur Feier des Geburtstages Sr. Majestät des Kaisers Wilhelm I., zu den öffentlichen Prüfungen der Meldorfer Gelehrtenschule ... und zur Entlassung der Abiturienten ... ladet ergebenst ein. Bundies, Meldorf 1871–1872
 Königliches Gymnasium Meldorf (Hrsg.): Programm des Königlichen Gymnasiums zu Meldorf. Bundies, Meldorf 1873–1881 (Jg. 1874 )
 Königliches Gymnasium Meldorf (Hrsg.): Einladung zur Vorfeier des Geburtstages Sr. Maj. des Kaisers u. Königs, verbunden mit der Entlassung der Abiturienten ... und zu den öffentlichen Prüfungen der Klassen. Bundies, Meldorf 1875
 Königliches Gymnasium Meldorf (Hrsg.): Jahresbericht über das Königliche Gymnasium zu Meldorf. Meldorf 1882–1915 (Jg. 1884–1911; 1915 )
 Wilhelm Lorenz: Geschichte des Königlichen Gymnasiums zu Meldorf bis zum Jahre 1777. Aus den Akten. Festschrift zum 350jährigen Jubiläum der Anstalt. Bundies, Meldorf 1891
 Wilhelm Lorenz: Festbericht über die Feier des 350jährigen Jubliäums des Königlichen Gymnasiums zu Meldorf am 2. und 3. Juli 1891. Bundies, Meldorf 1892
 Wilhelm Lorenz, Philipp Grühn: Katalog der Bibliothek des Gymnasiums in Meldorf. Sell, Greifswald 1895

Gymnasiums in Germany